King's Lynn was a constituency in Norfolk represented continually in the House of Commons of the Parliament of the United Kingdom from 1298 until it was abolished for the February 1974 general election.

History
The Parliamentary Borough of King's Lynn, which was known as Lynn or Bishop's Lynn prior to 1537, returned two Members of Parliament until 1885, when its representation was reduced to one member by the Redistribution of Seats Act 1885.  It was abolished as a Borough under the Representation of the People Act 1918 and was reconstituted as a Division of the Parliamentary County of Norfolk (from 1950, a County Constituency), absorbing the bulk of the abolished North Western Division.  It was abolished for the February 1974 general election, being replaced by the re-established constituency of North West Norfolk.

Sir Robert Walpole, the first Prime Minister, was an MP for the constituency for almost the entirety of his parliamentary career, from 1702 to 1742.

1885–1918: The existing parliamentary borough, and so much of the municipal borough of King's Lynn as was not already included in the parliamentary borough.

Boundaries
1918–1950: The Borough of King's Lynn, the Urban Districts of New Hunstanton and Walsoken, the Rural Districts of Docking, Freebridge Lynn, King's Lynn, and Marshland (except the parishes of Outwell and Upwell), and in the Rural District of Downham the parishes of Wiggenhall St Germans, Wiggenhall St Mary the Virgin, Wiggenhall St Mary Magdalen, and Wiggenhall St Peter.

1950–1974: The Municipal Borough of King's Lynn, the Urban District of New Hunstanton, and the Rural Districts of Docking, Freebridge Lynn, and Marshland.

Minor changes to the boundary with South West Norfolk to align with boundaries of local authorities, which had been rationalised.  Also marginal changes to county boundaries with Isle of Ely and Parts of Holland.

Members of Parliament

MPs before 1640

MPs 1640–1885

MPs 1885–1974

Elections

Elections in the 1830s

Elections in the 1840s

 

Canning resigned after being appointed the United Kingdom's ambassador to Turkey, causing a by-election.

 

 

Cavendish-Scott-Bentinck's death caused a by-election.

Elections in the 1850s

 
 
 

Jocelyn's death caused a by-election.

 
 

Stanley was appointed Secretary of State for the Colonies, requiring a by-election.

 

Stanley was appointed President of the Board of Control for the Affairs of India, requiring a by-election.

Elections in the 1860s

 
 

Stanley was appointed Secretary of State for Foreign Affairs, requiring a by-election.

 
 
 

Stanley succeed to the peerage, becoming 15th Earl of Derby and causing a by-election.

Elections in the 1870s

Elections in the 1880s 

 

representation reduced to one member

Bourke's resignation on appointment as Governor of Madras caused a by-election.

Elections in the 1890s

Elections in the 1900s

Elections in the 1910s 

General Election 1914/15

Another General Election was required to take place before the end of 1915. The political parties had been making preparations for an election to take place from 1914 and by the end of this year, the following candidates had been selected; 
Unionist: Holcombe Ingleby
Liberal:

Elections in the 1920s

Elections in the 1930s

Elections in the 1940s 
General Election 1939/40:

Another General Election was required to take place before the end of 1940. The political parties had been making preparations for an election to take place from 1939 and by the end of this year, the following candidates had been selected; 
Conservative: Somerset Maxwell
Labour: Frederick Wise 
Liberal: Robert Hugh Kerkham 
British Union: A E Ilett

Elections in the 1950s

Elections in the 1960s

Elections in the 1970s

References

Sources
 Robert Beatson, A Chronological Register of Both Houses of Parliament (London: Longman, Hurst, Res & Orme, 1807) 
 D Brunton & D H Pennington, Members of the Long Parliament (London: George Allen & Unwin, 1954)
 Cobbett's Parliamentary history of England, from the Norman Conquest in 1066 to the year 1803 (London: Thomas Hansard, 1808) 
 F W S Craig, British Parliamentary Election Results 1832–1885 (2nd edition, Aldershot: Parliamentary Research Services, 1989)
 
 The Constitutional Year Book for 1913 (London: National Union of Conservative and Unionist Associations, 1913)
 J E Neale, The Elizabethan House of Commons (London: Jonathan Cape, 1949)
 

Parliamentary constituencies in Norfolk (historic)
Constituencies of the Parliament of the United Kingdom established in 1298
Constituencies of the Parliament of the United Kingdom disestablished in 1974
Constituencies of the Parliament of the United Kingdom represented by a sitting Prime Minister
King's Lynn